Abhirami Ajai is an Indian playback singer. She is a graduate of St. Teresa's College, Ernakulam.  She started her career by singing her first song "Thottu Thottu" in the film Diamond Necklace.

Career 
Abhirami at the age of 13 got a chance to work with Vidyasagar for the film Diamond Necklace. The song was a hit. Later Abhirami worked with Vidyasagar, Ouseppachan, and Gopi Sunder.

Discography

2012

2013

2014

2016

2017

2019

References

External links 
List of Malayalam songs by Abhirami Ajai at MalayalaSangeetham
 

Living people
1997 births